Sanjar Tursunov (born 18 August 1998) is a Uzbekistani boxer. He competed in the men's heavyweight event at the 2020 Summer Olympics.

References

External links
 

1998 births
Living people
Uzbekistani male boxers
Olympic boxers of Uzbekistan
Boxers at the 2020 Summer Olympics
Place of birth missing (living people)
People from Surxondaryo Region
21st-century Uzbekistani people